Cunial is a surname of Italian origin. Notable people with the surname include:

 Ettore Cunial (1905–2005), Italian prelate
 Sara Cunial (born 1979), Italian politician

See also
 Cunila

Surnames of Italian origin
Italian-language surnames